Johannes Lodewyk Meyer Coleman (5 June 1910 – 13 January 1997) was a South African marathon runner. He won a gold medal at the 1938 British Empire Games, and placed sixth and fourth at the 1936 and 1948 Summer Olympics, respectively. At the 1938 Games he also participated in the 6 mile event, but was disqualified.

References

1910 births
1997 deaths
South African male marathon runners
South African male long-distance runners
Olympic athletes of South Africa
Athletes (track and field) at the 1936 Summer Olympics
Athletes (track and field) at the 1948 Summer Olympics
Athletes (track and field) at the 1938 British Empire Games
Commonwealth Games gold medallists for South Africa
Commonwealth Games medallists in athletics
People from Oudtshoorn
Sportspeople from the Western Cape
Medallists at the 1938 British Empire Games